Corporal John Cunningham , (22 October 1890 – 16 April 1917) was a British soldier during the First World War, an Irish recipient of the Victoria Cross, the highest and most prestigious award for gallantry in the face of the enemy that can be awarded to British and Commonwealth forces.

Details
Cunningham, born in Thurles, County Tipperary on 22 October 1890, was one of two sons of Johanna and Joseph Cunningham.
 
He was 26 years old, and a corporal in the 2nd Battalion, Prince of Wales's Leinster Regiment, when he performed a deed on 12 April 1917 at Bois-en-Hache, near Barlin, France, which earned him the Victoria Cross. Cunningham later died as a result of his injuries.

He is buried in Barlin cemetery, Pas de Calais, plot 1, row A, grave 39.

The Medal
His medals are on loan to the Imperial War Museum in London.

References

Listed in order of publication year 
The Register of the Victoria Cross (1981, 1988 and 1997)

Ireland's VCs (Dept of Economic Development, 1995)
Monuments to Courage (David Harvey, 1999)
Irish Winners of the Victoria Cross (Richard Doherty & David Truesdale, 2000)

1890 births
1917 deaths
Burials in France
Military personnel from County Tipperary
Irish soldiers in the British Army
Irish World War I recipients of the Victoria Cross
Prince of Wales's Leinster Regiment soldiers
British Army personnel of World War I
British military personnel killed in World War I
People from Thurles
British Army recipients of the Victoria Cross